Xinzhuang Sub-city Center is a national-level rezoning area located on the west side of New Taipei City and the north side of Xinzhuang District. With a total area of about 100 hectares, Xinzhuang Sub-city Center was designated as the new prime central business district, administration center, and transport hub of New Taipei City. Designed in the 2010s and developed from the 2020s onwards, Xinzhuang Sub-city Center complements Xinban Special District, becoming twin cities spanning both sides of the Dahan River. Important infrastructure, such as Xinzhuang Joint Office Tower, New Taipei Industrial Park and International Community Radio Taipei, is located within this area.

Recent Development 

In recent years, Xinzhuang Sub-city Center has slowly developed into an urban core with many skyscraper office towers and commercial facilities.

Transportation

Mass Rapid Transit

Taipei Metro
 Circular line: New Taipei Industrial Park metro station

Taoyuan Metro
 Taoyuan Airport MRT: 
 New Taipei Industrial Park metro station
 Xinzhuang Fuduxin metro station

Road 
Provincial Highway 1
Provincial Highway 64
Provincial Highway 65

Gallery

See also 
 Xinyi Planning District
 Xinban Special District
 Taoyuan Zhongzheng Arts and Cultural Business District
 Urban planning
 Qingpu Special District

References 

Central business districts in Taiwan
Economy of New Taipei
Planned cities in Taiwan